Lamini (members are called laminoids) is a tribe of the subfamily Camelinae. It contains one extant genus with four species, all exclusively from South America: llamas, alpacas, vicuñas, and guanacos. The former two are domesticated species, while the latter two are only found in the wild. None display sexual dimorphism. The four species can interbreed and produce fertile offspring. Additionally, there are two extinct genera known from the fossil record.

The digestive system of lamoids allows them to digest certain toxins. Laminoids also lack a gallbladder.

Characteristics and distribution

Llamas are not a natural species; rather, they were domesticated by the Peruvians and Bolivians of the highlands. Commercial trade led to the llama's current abundance in Colombia, Ecuador, Peru, Bolivia, Chile, Paraguay, and northeast Argentina. There are bands of llamas in the United States, Europe, Japan, and New Zealand.

The color and length of the llama's wool is variable, depending on the race. The diameter of llama wool's fiber varies between 20 and 80 micrometers, depending on whether the llamas were raised for its wool or as a pack animal.

Its pelage is longer than vicuña wool but shorter than that of the alpaca; it is considered to be of excellent quality and has a light brown, reddish, or brown-yellow color. The diameter of its fleece's fibers varies between 16 and 18 micrometers.

90% of the world's guanacos are in Argentina, distributed from the islands of the Beagle Channel and the southern extremity of the Patagonia to the Puna grassland in northwestern Argentina. Guanacos can also be found in Bolivia, Chile, Paraguay, and Peru.

It is slightly larger than the vicuña. Normally, the alpaca is found in the Andes in Peru and Bolivia, though it also inhabits northern Chile and northwestern Argentina. There are about 3.5 million alpacas in the world. In the 1980s, alpacas started being exported to other countries for farming purposes: they can be found in the United States, Australia, and New Zealand, though the vast majority still reside in South America.

The alpaca is mainly raised for its wool. Out of the domestic camelids, the alpaca produces wool with longer and finer fiber than the llama, with a strand diameter of 18–25 micrometers.

Its coat is mainly beige in color and is said to make "the best wool in the world", with the average fiber diameter between 11 and 14 micrometers. Like rodents, the vicuña has continuously-growing incisors. It lives only in areas of high altitude –  or greater – in the highlands of Argentina, Bolivia, Chile, Peru, and Ecuador.

See also
 Ruminant
 Ungulate

References

Camelids
Mammals of South America
Mammal tribes